Andrea Servili (born 18 July 1975) is an Italian football coach and a former goalkeeper who works as a goalkeeping coach with Alessandria.

Caps on football series 

Lega Pro Prima Divisione : 23 (0)

Lega Pro Seconda Divisione : 300 (0)

Serie D : 114 (1)

Total : 437 (0)

External links 

1975 births
Sportspeople from the Province of Ascoli Piceno
Footballers from Marche
Living people
Italian footballers
Association football goalkeepers
A.S. Sambenedettese players
S.S. Teramo Calcio players
U.S. Alessandria Calcio 1912 players
Serie C players
Serie D players